The 1980–81 SK Rapid Wien season was the 83rd season in club history.

Squad

Squad and statistics

Squad statistics

Fixtures and results

League

Cup

References

1980-81 Rapid Wien Season
Rapid